The Singapore Cup is an annual knockout football competition in men's domestic Singaporean football. Established in 1998, it is the foremost football cup competition in the country. It is open to clubs in the Singapore Premier League. 

Since 2005, foreign teams from other countries in Southeast Asia are occasionally invited to compete in the Singapore Cup. Chonburi Province FC from Thailand was the first foreign club reaching the final in 2006 (they lost 3–2 in the final to local club Tampines Rovers). In 2009, Bangkok Glass became the second foreign team to reach the final, losing against local club Geylang United, but they beat Tampines Rovers in 2010 to become the first foreign winners of the Singapore Cup.

Winners of the Singapore Cup gain qualification into the Asian continental club competition AFC Cup. Hougang United are the current holders, having beaten Tampines Rovers 3–2 at the 2022 final. It is their inaugural title.

Past results

Performance by club

See also 
 Singapore Premier League
 Singapore League Cup
 Singapore Community Shield
 Football Association of Singapore
 List of football clubs in Singapore

References

External links
Singapore – List of Cup Winners, RSSSF.com

 
National association football cups
Cup
Recurring sporting events established in 1998
1998 establishments in Singapore